Nicholas Bryan (born 3 November 1955) is a Hong Kong sailor. He competed in the Finn event at the 1988 Summer Olympics.

References

1955 births
Living people
Hong Kong male sailors (sport)
Olympic sailors of Hong Kong
Sailors at the 1988 Summer Olympics – Finn
Place of birth missing (living people)
20th-century Hong Kong people